Martin Fenin (16 April 1987) is a Czech football striker who plays for FK Řeporyje. He has represented the Czech Republic and formerly played for the youth teams of the Czech Republic from the under-16 level.

Club career
Fenin started playing professional football for FK Teplice. In 2007, he won the Talent of the Year award at the Czech Footballer of the Year awards. Following his performance at the 2007 FIFA U-20 World Cup in Canada, many large clubs expressed interest in him. Juventus was one of the teams in the scramble to sign the Czech forward from his home club. The deal looked to be sealed but Fenin had a change of heart after claiming he would not be happy as Juventus would loan him out to Udinese Calcio or Genoa CFC for a season. He then swiftly agreed to a deal with Eintracht Frankfurt worth €3.5 million, where he got to a good start, scoring a hat-trick in his first match. In the last day of transfer window 31 August 2011, he moved to Energie Cottbus.

FC Zbrojovka Brno
Since the summer break in 2016, he has been in touch with the Czech First League team FC Zbrojovka Brno. He went through a three-month fitness programme. On 3 November 2016, he started his trial there, with the goal to incorporate into U-21 squad in the rest of the autumn and to gain a place in preparing with the first team in the winter break.

International

Fenin played for several different youth national teams of the Czech Republic having the most starts for the under-19 team. Fenin scored three goals for the Czechs in the 2007 FIFA U-20 World Cup in Canada, including one in the final against Argentina. After the tournament he won 16th place in a poll for best under-21 player. On 22 August 2007 Fenin made his international debut for the national team against Austria. As of 2008, Fenin was a  part of the Czech national team and was nominated for the UEFA Euro 2008, but did not play in the tournament.

After a 2009 defeat against Slovakia in the qualification for the 2010 FIFA World Cup, coach Petr Rada was dismissed along with several players. These players (Fenin among them) were suspended indefinitely from the team by the Football Association of the Czech Republic for an alleged disciplinary breach. He returned to action for his country a year later, playing in the friendly match against Turkey on 22 May 2010.

International goals
Scores and results list the Czech Republic's tally first.

Personal life
In June 2021, Fenin spoke about mental health in football and his struggles with alcoholism. Fenin, working for the FIFPRO's mental health awareness programme said that "[He] always fled into alcohol when [he] encountered problems", and added that "talking was his biggest problem", advising players struggling with mental health to reach out to someone.

Honours
Czech Rupublic U-21
FIFA U-20 World Cup runner-up (1) 2007

References

External links 
 
  
 Martin Fenin at eintracht-archiv.de 
 Martin Fenin at Kicker
 

1987 births
Czech footballers
FK Teplice players
Eintracht Frankfurt players
FC Energie Cottbus players
Living people
Czech Republic youth international footballers
Czech Republic under-21 international footballers
Czech Republic international footballers
Association football forwards
Expatriate footballers in Germany
Bundesliga players
2. Bundesliga players
People from Cheb
UEFA Euro 2008 players
Czech First League players
FC Zbrojovka Brno players
Chemnitzer FC players
SK Slavia Prague players
3. Liga players
FK Varnsdorf players
Czech National Football League players
FC Istres players
Sportspeople from the Karlovy Vary Region